Inés María Calero Rodríguez  (born March 21, 1969) is a Venezuelan actress and beauty queen who was Miss Venezuela 1987 and was the official representative of Venezuela to the Miss Universe 1987 pageant held in Singapore on May 26, 1987, when she won the title of third Runner up.

Biography 
Inés María Calero Rodríguez was born on March 21, 1969, in Punta de Piedras, Nueva Esparta, Venezuela. She has three sisters.

Personal life 
In 1993, she married the Venezuelan merenguero Miguel Moly. On July 13, 1993, she gave birth to the couple's first child, a boy, whom they called Jonathan Moly Calero. On March 28, 1996, she gave birth to the couple's second child, a girl, whom they called Estefanía Moly Calero. The couple divorced in 2016.

Career

Modeling career 
In 1987, she participated in the Venezuelan beauty pageant Miss Venezuela 1987 representing the state Punta de Piedras, Nueva Esparta. The contest was held on Friday February 6, 1987 at the Teatro Municipal of Caracas and had the participation of 23 candidates for the title. In this edition, Inés María Calero won the crown and also obtained the title of Miss Photogenic. In 1987, she attended Miss South America 1987, held in Cartagena, Colombia in which she obtained the second runner-up band. In 1988, she delivered her crown as Miss Venezuela.

Television career 
Inés María Calero began her career in television in the year 1988. From 1988 to 1989, she was part of the cast of the television series Abigail. In 1989, she was part of the cast of the television series Rubí rebelde. From 1990 to 1991, she was part of the cast of the television series De mujeres. In 1992, she was part of the cast of the television series La loba herida. In 1997, she was part of the cast of the television series Todo por tu amor.  In 2004, she was part of the cast of the television series Ángel Rebelde.

Filmography

Television

References

External links
Miss Venezuela Official Website
Miss Universe Official Website

1969 births
Living people
Miss Universe 1987 contestants
Miss Venezuela winners
People from Caracas